Edinburgh Law Review is a triannual academic journal published by Edinburgh University Press in January, May, and September of each year. It was founded in 1996 and focuses on international as well as Scots law.

External links 
 

Edinburgh University Press academic journals
Law journals
Publications established in 1996
Triannual journals
English-language journals
1996 establishments in Scotland
Magazines published in Scotland
Scots law